Cadillac Mountain is located on Mount Desert Island, within Acadia National Park, in the U.S. state of Maine. It is known as the first place in the continental U.S. to see the sunrise, although that is only true for a portion of the year.

History

Before being renamed in 1918, the mountain had been called Green Mountain. The new name honors the French explorer and adventurer Antoine de La Mothe Cadillac. In 1688, De la Mothe requested and received from the Governor of New France a parcel of land in an area known as Donaquec which included part of the Donaquec River (now the Union River) and the island of Mount Desert in the present-day U.S. state of Maine. Antoine Laumet de La Mothe, a shameless self-promoter who had already appropriated the "de la Mothe" portion of his name from a local nobleman in his native Picardy, thereafter referred to himself as Antoine de la Mothe, sieur de Cadillac, Donaquec, and Mount Desert.

From 1883 until 1893 the Green Mountain Cog Railway ran to the summit to take visitors to the Green Mountain Hotel. The hotel burned down in 1895 and the cog train was sold and moved to the Mount Washington Cog Railway in New Hampshire.

Overview

There are various hiking trails and a paved road that lead to the summit of Cadillac Mountain. Going to the summit to see the first sunrise in the continental U.S. is a common activity; however, Cadillac only experiences the first sunrise from October 7 through March 6. For a few weeks around the equinoxes, the sun rises first at West Quoddy Head in Lubec, Maine. During the remainder of spring and throughout summer, the sun rises first on Mars Hill,  to the northeast.

References

External links

Mount Desert Island
Mountains of Hancock County, Maine
Highest points of United States national parks
Acadia National Park
Mountains of Maine